Major William M. Jones (August 23, 1895 – 1969) was a Canadian soldier of World War I and World War II who served with distinction with the Yugoslav Partisans.

Biography 
Jones was born in Bear River, Nova Scotia. His code name was "Lawrence of Yugoslavia" (a term also used to describe Linn Farrish). In World War I, Jones was wounded three times, losing one eye, for which he was awarded the Distinguished Conduct Medal with Bar.  During the Second World War, Major William M. Jones spent 12 months with the Yugoslav Partisans. On 19 May 1943, he parachuted into Yugoslavia to become an Allied representative to Marshal Josip Broz Tito. He features in Eastern Approaches, the first memoirs of Fitzroy Maclean. Jones died in Dunnville, Ontario on September 1, 1969.

See also 
Military history of Nova Scotia

References 
Endnotes

Texts
 

 
 
 
 
 Rempel Arthur, Karen, 2012, 'The Tenacious Spy:  The Story of William Morris Jones, Amazon, ISBN 978-1469966755

External links 
 
 

1895 births
1969 deaths
Canadian military personnel of World War I
Canadian military personnel of World War II
Canadian recipients of the Distinguished Conduct Medal
Military history of Nova Scotia
Canadian military personnel from Nova Scotia
Canadian Militia officers
Canadian Army officers
Canadian Expeditionary Force officers

Black Watch (Royal Highland Regiment) of Canada soldiers
Black Watch (Royal Highland Regiment) of Canada officers